The Leapmotor T03 (Chinese: 零跑T03) is an electric city car manufactured and sold in China by Leapmotor.

Overview

The Leapmotor T03 is the second product launched by the firm, following the S01 coupe. The T03 hatchback was launched on May 11, 2020, with the MSRP priced from 65,800 to 75,800 yuan on the Chinese market. The T03 is offered in three variants, including the 400 Standard Edition, the 400 Comfort Edition, and the 400 Deluxe Edition. The Leapmotor T03 is powered by a 36.5 kWh high-performance lithium battery with a density of 171 Wh/kg and offers a maximum range of up to 403 km (NEDC) in a single charge. The T03 also supports fast charging and 80 per cent charge can be done in 36 minutes with the battery coming with an 8 year/150,000 km warranty. The power of the T03 comes from a 55 kW motor that makes a maximum torque of 155 Nm.

The Leapmotor T03 features Level 2 autonomous driving capability, and is equipped with three external cameras and twelve radars (one millimetrewave and 11 ultrasonic units). Interior features of the T03 include an 8.0-inch TFT instrument console and a 10.1-inch touchscreen.

References

Production electric cars
City cars
2020s cars
Cars introduced in 2020
Cars of China
T03